Alfredo S. Lim: The Untold Story is a 2013 Filipino biographical action film directed, co-written by, and starring Cesar Montano as the eponymous police general Alfredo Lim. Starring alongside Montano is Alessandra de Rossi, Nonie Buencamino, Marc Abaya, Alwyn Uytingco, Alvin Anson, Tirso Cruz III, Jackie Lou Blanco, Isabel Granada, and Kristel Romero. It is the fourth film to be based on Lim's life as a police officer, after Alfredo Lim: Manila Police (1977), Target... Police General (1989), and Alfredo Lim: Batas ng Maynila (1995).

Lim offered Montano the project, who in turn was inspired to showcase events in Lim's life that have not been tackled yet in his previous biopics. Produced by CM Films, the film was released on February 27, 2013, timed to run before Lim's reelection campaign as Mayor of Manila.

Cast

Production
Cesar Montano was offered the project by Alfredo Lim himself, who favored him as director and actor because of his interest in portraying Lim's childhood while others only took interest in his exploits as a police officer. With the film, Montano sought to showcase parts of Lim's life that have not been tackled yet by the three existing biopics of the police general, taking inspiration from a biography of Lim written by National Artist Nick Joaquin. The film was publicly announced on October 22, 2012, and had the working title Turning Cradle: The Untold Story of Alfredo Lim.

Production began on November 26, 2012, and ended in February 2013. A "Rough Cut" trailer was released on YouTube through Lim's channel on January 30.

Release
The film premiered at SM City Manila on February 26, 2013, and was released nationwide on February 27, timed for an exhibition run before the campaign period of the 2013 Philippine local elections, where Lim is running a reelection campaign for Mayor of Manila. A brief controversy occurred a few weeks before election day (May 13) when Lim handed out a pirated copy of the film to the media for viewing, though his chief of staff Ric de Guzman strongly denied its pirated nature, stating "How can those CDs be pirated when it was the producer himself who gave them to the mayor?"

See also
Bato: The General Ronald dela Rosa Story, a 2019 film about another Filipino police officer turned Senator, also released before an election's campaign period

References

External links

2013 films
2010s biographical films
2013 action films
Cultural depictions of Alfredo Lim
Filipino-language films
Films about police officers
Films set in the 1930s
Films set in the 1960s
Philippine action films
Philippine biographical films
Films directed by Cesar Montano